Ḫebat  or Hepat (Ugaritic: 𐎃𐎁𐎚, ḪBT) was a Hurrian goddess. She was the tutelary deity of Halab (modern Aleppo) in origin, and in that role appears already in pre-Hurrian texts from Ebla. Her status was not identical in all Hurrian centers: while she was the main goddess in the pantheons of Halab and various cities of Kizzuwatna, her role in Ugarit and in eastern cities like Nuzi was smaller. 

Due to the influence of Hurrian religion, she was also worshiped by Hittites and Luwians, as well as by some of their neo-Hittite successors. 

Hebat's best attested role is that of the wife of the weather god, whose identity varied depending on culture and time period. In Eblaite sources she was associated with Adad, while in Hurrian ones with Teshub. Late sources from Tabal associate her with Luwian Tarhunt.

Name and origin
A goddess named dḪa-a-ba-du (Ḫalabatu), associated with Halab (modern Aleppo) is first attested in the text from Ebla from the reigns of kings Irkab-Damu and Ishar-Damu (third millennium BCE). Alfonso Archi assumes that she was an early form of Hebat. The view that Hebat was originally the city goddess of Halab is also supported by other researchers, including Marie-Claude Trémouille, Gary Beckman and Piotr Taracha.

The name Ḫalabatu is most likely a nisba, indication of point of origin, meaning "she of Halab." 

Alfonso Archi proposes that the form "Hebat" emerged due to loss of l due to a process of velarization. The spellings Hepat and Hebat can both be found in literature, with the former being an attempt at representing unvoiced consonants present in the Hurrian language.

In theophoric names Hebat is often written as -hepa (-heba), as seen in the example of Mittani princesses Kelu-hepa and Tadu-hepa, Hittite queen Puduḫepa or Abdi-Heba, the ruler of Jerusalem known from the Amarna correspondence.

Worship
dḪa-a-ba-du (Ḫalabatu) appears in various Eblaite offering lists, according to which she received various golden and silver objects, as well as cattle. However, she was not a goddess of major importance in the religion of Ebla. According to Alfonso Archi, after the fall of Ebla she was among the gods who did not retain their former position in the religion of the Amorites, who became the dominant culture in Syria. He lists Adamma, Ammarik, Aštabi and Šanugaru as other similar examples. He assumes that they were reduced to the status of deities of at best local significance, and as a result were easily incorporated into the religion of the Hurrians when they arrived in the same area a few centuries later.

Hebat is mentioned in a letter from Mari, in which an anonymous woman mentions she will pray for king Zimri-Lim to her and a weather god (dIŠKUR), possibly Teshub. She is also known from a text from Halab, according to which she was worshiped alongside Dagan and Shalash in the pagrā'um ritual, part of a mourning ceremony.

In later times, Hebat was the highest ranked Hurrian goddess in the traditions of Halab and the kingdom of Kizzuwatna, where she was worshiped in Kummanni and Lawazantiya. However, she only acquired this position by displacing Shaushka from her position attested in sources from most Hurrian centers in the east, such as Nuzi. Hebat's position was also relatively low in the Hurrian pantheon of Ugarit, where Shaushka retained the role of the foremost goddess. 

While Hebat was not regarded as one of the major deities of the eastern Hurrian polities, she was also not entirely unknown there, as she appears in theophoric names of Mitanni princesses and relatives of a prince of Nuzi. 

One ceremony dedicated to Hebat was concerned with the concept of allašši, "ladyship," analogous to Teshub's ceremony of šarrašši, "kingship."

In Hurrian sources, various paraphernalia connected to the cult of Hebat could be worshiped too, for example her throne.

Hittite and Luwian reception
Hebat was among the Hurrian and Syrian deities incorporated into the Hittite state pantheon. She is mentioned for the first time in Hittite sources in an account of Ḫattušili I's expedition against Ḫaššum, during which he seized the statues of deities worshiped in this Hurrian polity, among them this goddess, but also Lelluri, Allatum, Adalur and the storm god of Halab. 

King Muršili II introduced the worship of Hebat to Katapa, where he resided near the end of his reign. During the reign of Tudḫaliya IV, she was worshiped alongside other deities associated with Teshub during a section of the  taking place in the temple of Kataḫḫa. There is also some evidence that the worship of Hebat spread to cities located in the north of the Hittite sphere of influence, including Hurma and Uda.

Hebat is depicted on the central relief of the Hittite Yazilikaya sanctuary, dedicated to the worship of deities of Hurrian origin, alongside Teshub. She stands on the back of a leopard. Her children - Šarruma, Allanzu and Kunzišalli - stand behind her.

Hebat was also worshiped by the Luwians as a result of Teshub, adopted from Halab, displacing the native storm god Tarhunt in the pantheons of their easternmost communities.

In the early  first millennium BCE, Hebat was worshiped alongside Tarhunt in the neo-Hittite kingdom of Tabal.

Associations with other deities
According to Daniel Schwemer, Hebat's primary function was that of a spouse, and she existed largely in the shadow of her husband. It is possible that the association between her and a weather god, whose identity varied, went as far back as the twenty seventh century BCE. It is assumed that Halabadu and Addu (Adad), the weather god, were already viewed as a couple in the Eblaite texts. In Hurrian tradition, her spouse was Teshub. In late sources from Tabal, this role was played by Tarhunt. It is also possible Hebat was regarded as the wife of the weather god in Emar, where traditions pertaining to coastal Baal, inland Adad and Hurrian Teshub likely coexisted.

Lluís Feliu argues that in Syrian tradition Hebat was likely viewed as Dagan's daughter and as such as a sister of the storm god of Halab.

In an Ugaritic source, Hebat is equated with Pidray, one of the daughters of the local weather god, Baal. According to Daniel Schwemer, it is unlikely that this equation was based on a tradition in which Pidray was Baal's wife, and the latter, unlike his counterparts, was most likely regarded as unmarried.

of Hebat

A similar selection of deities follows Hebat and her family in the Yazılıkaya sanctuary: Takitu, Hutena and Hutellura, Allani, Ishara, Nabarbi, Shalash, Damkina, Nikkal, Aya, Shaushka and Shuwala are identified by name in accompanying inscriptions, while six other goddesses are left unnamed. 

Another deity attested in association with Hebat in ritual texts is Mušuni, who formed a dyad with her.  Her name means "she of justice." It has been proposed that she was an underworld goddess, and in one case she appears in a ritual alongside Allani and Ishara. Piotr Tarcha assumes that she can be considered a personified attribute or epithet of Hebat. 

Hebat could also form a dyad alongside one of her children, usually Šarruma, though attestations of Allanzu in such a role are known too.

Two deities are attested in the role of Hebat's sukkal (divine attendant), Takitu and Tiyabenti. While only Takitu appears in myths, she and Tiyabenti coexist in ritual texts, where both can accompany their mistress, which according to Marie-Claude Trémouille means that theories according to which one of them was merely an epithet of the other are unsubstantiated.

Sun goddess of Arinna and Hebat

In an effort to harmonize the dynastic pantheon of the Hittite kings, which was influenced by Hurrian religion, with the state pantheon consisting out of Hattic and Hittite  deities (of hurrian, sumerian, luwian origin) , attempts were made to syncretise Hebat and the Sun goddess of Arinna. The best known source attesting it is a prayer of queen Puduḫepa, wife of Ḫattušili III:

Piotr Taracha considers it impossible that this idea was adopted into everyday religious practices of the general Hittite population. Gary Beckman refers to it as a "rare and exceptional" example. Daniel Schwemer notes that the character of the Sun goddess of Arinna was dissimilar to that of Hebat. as unlike the latter she had a well established individual role in the pantheon. Furthermore, Hebat never replaced her in her traditional position in treaties and similar documents.

Mythology
Hebat is mentioned in passing in the Song of Ḫedammu when Ea warns Teshub that if the conflict between him and Kumarbi continues, the gods' human followers might be harmed, leading to Hebat having to work to provide gods with food. She also appears in the Song of Ullikummi, in which the eponymous monster blocks the entrance of her temple, making her unable to communicate with other gods. She tasks her sukkal Takitu with finding out the fate of her husband Teshub after his initial confrontation with Ullikummi, and laments his absence. Later Teshub's brother Tashmishu manages to bring a message from him to Hebat, which almost makes her falls from the roof of her temple. To prevent that, her servanbts have to hold her. Hebat's isolation is also mentioned by Ea when he asks the world giant Upelluri if he is aware of the impact of Ullikummi on the world.

In a myth preserved on the tablet CTH 346.12 Hebat instructs Takitu to travel through the lands of Mitanni to distant Šimurrum on her behalf.

References

Bibliography

Hurrian deities
Hittite deities
Luwian goddesses
Eblaite deities
Tutelary deities
Ugaritic deities
History of Aleppo